The 2005 NCAA Division II men's basketball tournament involved 64 schools playing in a single-elimination tournament to determine the national champion of men's NCAA Division II college basketball as the culmination of the 2004–05 NCAA Division II men's basketball season. It was won by Virginia Union University and VUU's Antwan Walton was the Most Outstanding Player.

Regionals

Northeast – Waltham, Massachusetts
Location: Dana Center Host: Bentley College

East - Misenheimer, North Carolina 
Location: Merner Gym Host: Pfeiffer University

South Central - Commerce, Texas 
Location: Texas A&M-Commerce Field House Host: Texas A&M University-Commerce

West - Bellingham, Washington 
Location: Haggen Court at Sam Carver Gymnasium Host: Western Washington University

South - Boca Raton, Florida 
Location: Count and Countess de Hoernle Sports and Cultural Center Host: Lynn University

Great Lakes - Findlay, Ohio 
Location: Houdeshell Court at Croy Gymnasium Host: University of Findlay

North Central - Denver, Colorado 
Location: Auraria Events Center Host: Metropolitan State University

South Atlantic - Bowie, Maryland 
Location: A.C. Jordan Arena Host: Bowie State University

Elite Eight – Grand Forks, North Dakota 
Location: Ralph Engelstad Arena Host: University of North Dakota

All-tournament team
 Chris Burns (Bryant)
 Duan Crockett (Virginia Union)
 Luqman Jabaar (Virginia Union)
 John Williams (Bryant)
 Antwan Walton (Virginia Union)

See also
 2005 NCAA Division II women's basketball tournament
 2005 NCAA Division I men's basketball tournament
 2005 NCAA Division III men's basketball tournament
 2005 NAIA Division I men's basketball tournament
 2005 NAIA Division II men's basketball tournament

References
 2005 NCAA Division II men's basketball tournament jonfmorse.com

NCAA Division II men's basketball tournament
Tournament
Basketball in the Dallas–Fort Worth metroplex
NCAA Division II basketball tournament
NCAA Division II basketball tournament